Seitzhan Omarov (1907-1985) was a Kazakh writer. He is the author of numerous short stories, sketches, and fairy tales. His work was published in 20 collections of short stories. Omarov was an editor of "Zhazushy" publishing company. The high school number 3 in Atbasar, Kazakhstan, is named after Omarov. A museum of the writer can also be found there.

References

External links
 http://www.spring.kz/?lang=ru&id=3&subid=1&num=28 - State children Library after S.Begalin

1907 births
1985 deaths
Kazakhstani writers